George Cannady Phillips (August 14, 1921 – December 11, 1994) was an American football linebacker who played one season with the Cleveland Rams of the National Football League. He was drafted by the Philadelphia Eagles in the eighth round of the 1944 NFL Draft. He played college football at the University of California, Los Angeles and attended John C. Fremont High School in Los Angeles, California.

References

External links
Just Sports Stats

1921 births
1994 deaths
Players of American football from Los Angeles
American football linebackers
UCLA Bruins football players
Cleveland Rams players
John C. Fremont High School alumni